Chalcides sphenopsiformis, or Duméril's wedge-snouted skink, is a species of lizard in the family Scincidae. The species is found in Morocco, Western Sahara, Mauritania, and Senegal.

References

Chalcides
Skinks of Africa
Reptiles described in 1856
Taxa named by Auguste Duméril